The 1973 Middle Tennessee Blue Raiders football team represented Middle Tennessee State University—as a member of the Ohio Valley Conference (OVC) during the 1973 NCAA Division II football season. Led by fourth-year head coach Bill Peck, the Blue Raiders compiled a record an overall record of 4–7 with a mark of 3–4 in conference play, tying for fifth place in the OVC. The team's captains were J. Pelt and Ed Witherspoon.

Schedule

References

Middle Tennessee
Middle Tennessee Blue Raiders football seasons
Middle Tennessee Blue Raiders football